Laurel Elizabeth Keyes (February 3, 1907 – 1983) was an American writer, lecturer and counselor. She is best known for her early works on sound therapy and weight management.

Biography
Keyes was a writer from an early age. Over the years, she wrote stories, articles and poetry for magazines and newspapers. She received her education in the transpersonal field from a variety of Eastern and Western sources, having started her studies in Comparative Religions and philosophy when she was 19. She lectured and conducted retreats for churches of all the major religions, and for more than 16 years lectured for adult education in the public school system. Her writings reflect a practical blending of popular in-depth methods of modern psychology and the ancient traditional teachings of metaphysics and philosophy.

In 1952 Mrs. Keyes founded Overweight Overcomers International, one of the first self-help groups dedicated to problems of obesity, and wrote the book How to Win the Losing Fight, a weight-control guide that helped thousands to better health. In 1963 she founded the Order of Fransisters and Brothers, a lay order following the outline of the well-known prayer beginning "Lord, make me an instrument." It is a non-profit, inter-religious movement, sponsoring silent retreats, study and research. Keyes' most popular book is her 1973 work Toning: The Creative Power of the Voice, which is cited by sound therapists. Her legacy also includes the Restorium, a chapel and retreat house in the mountains near Denver. Keyes resided in Denver, Colorado until her death in 1983.

The sound and toning healing work of Keyes is again being carried on throughout the world in the integration of cymatics (sound) and light therapies. In the form of "giving voice" to bodily ailments, it has been integrated by Manhattan oncologist Dr. Mitchell L. Gaynor. Keyes' work has inspired VibrationsHeal, an ongoing support and toning study group based in Burlington, Vermont. VibrationsHeal teaches bi-weekly outreach meetings and seminar programs on the use of toning to maintain optimum health and restore health from many types of ailments and situations.

Published works
Toning: The Creative Power of the Voice
Seeing Through Your Illusions
How to Win the Losing Fight
What's Eating You?
Mystery of Sex
Living Can Be Fun
Close the Door Softly as You Go
Sundial
Knowing God
The Angel Who Remembered
The Gift
I Am a Child
Seedlings from the Vine
Transform Your Life
Dust Thou Art
Discussion of Happiness
The Person I Was Meant to Be
Let Your Light So Shine
The Lost Village
The Way to the Village
Order of Fransisters and Franbrothers
The Fransister Communion
Fransister Foods

References

External links
Gentle Living Publications (Keyes' literary executor)

1907 births
1983 deaths
20th-century American poets
American women short story writers
American women poets
20th-century American women writers
20th-century American short story writers
American women non-fiction writers
20th-century American non-fiction writers